Edward Francis McDonald (September 21, 1844 – November 5, 1892) was an American Democratic Party politician who represented New Jersey's 7th congressional district in the United States House of Representatives from 1891 to 1892.

Life and career
McDonald was born in Ireland on September 21, 1844, and immigrated to the United States when six years of age with his parents, who settled in Newark, New Jersey and attended the Newark Public Schools. During the Civil War, he enlisted in Company I, Seventh Regiment, New Jersey Volunteer Infantry, in 1861, and was honorably discharged in 1862. He learned the machinist trade and became a skilled mechanic. He moved to Harrison, New Jersey in 1874. He was a member of the New Jersey General Assembly in 1874, and director at large of the Board of Chosen Freeholders of Hudson County in 1877, and was reelected in 1879 and served four years. He presented credentials as a member-elect to the New Jersey Senate in 1890 and served throughout the session until the last day, when he was unseated, but was restored to the seat in the following session. He was interested in real estate business. He served as treasurer of Harrison in 1881.

McDonald was elected as a Democrat to the Fifty-second Congress and served from March 4, 1891, until his death in Harrison on November 5, 1892, just a few days before the Congressional election. He was interred in Holy Sepulchre Cemetery in East Orange, New Jersey.

See also
List of United States Congress members who died in office (1790–1899)

References

External links

Edward Francis McDonald at The Political Graveyard

County commissioners in New Jersey
Democratic Party New Jersey state senators
Democratic Party members of the United States House of Representatives from New Jersey
Politicians from Hudson County, New Jersey
Politicians from Newark, New Jersey
People from Harrison, New Jersey
1844 births
1892 deaths
Burials at Holy Sepulchre Cemetery (East Orange, New Jersey)
Democratic Party members of the New Jersey General Assembly
19th-century American politicians